Muddy Creek Forks Historic District is a national historic district located at the Village of Muddy Creek Forks in East Hopewell, Fawn, and Lower Chanceford Townships in York County, Pennsylvania. The district includes 12 contributing buildings, 1 contributing site, and 5 contributing structures. The buildings and structures were constructed between about 1800 and 1935. The buildings include the general store, six houses, a mill, grain elevator, warehouse, and Sweitzer barn. Most of the buildings incorporate Late Victorian style details. The structures are two bridges, a corn crib, a weigh station, and a mill race.  The site is the site of a former mill and mill pond.

It was listed on the National Register of Historic Places in 1994.

References 

Historic districts on the National Register of Historic Places in Pennsylvania
Historic districts in York County, Pennsylvania
National Register of Historic Places in York County, Pennsylvania